Lützow's Wild Hunt (German: Lützows wilde verwegene Jagd) is a patriotic German song.

The poem was written by young German poet and soldier Theodor Körner, who served in the Lützow Free Corps during the Wars of Liberation. It was set to music by Carl Maria von Weber and became very popular.

The song praises the deeds of the Free Corps that became an essential part of Germany's national identity in the 19th century due to its famous members. Besides Körner, "Turnvater" Friedrich Ludwig Jahn, the famous poet Joseph von Eichendorff, the inventor of the kindergarten Friedrich Fröbel, and Eleonore Prochaska, a woman who had dressed as a man in order to join the fight against the French, served in the Corps.

The tune was adopted as the regimental march of the 1st Surrey Rifles, a Volunteer unit of the British Army.

Bibliography
 Anon, A War Record of the 21st London Regiment (First Surrey Rifles), 1914–1919, 1927/Uckfield: Naval & Military, 2003, .

References

German patriotic songs